The San Bernardino County Fire Protection District (SBCoFD) or The San Bernardino County Fire Protection District provides fire protection and emergency medical services to the unincorporated parts of San Bernardino County, California and to 24 incorporated cities. San Bernardino County is the largest county in the United States by area covering a total of 20,160 square miles. The San Bernardino County Fire Protection District is responsible for responding to 19,278 square miles of San Bernardino County and serves a population of over 2 million people.

History 
The history of The San Bernardino County Fire Department begins with the Fontana Fire Department which was organized in 1928 and originally covered 22.5 square miles. On November 28, 1928 Earl B. Reeves was appointed as the Chief by the fire commission. Reeves was a former Captain with the San Bernardino City Fire Department and president of the Fireman’s Relief Association of San Bernardino. He inherited a force of 12 volunteers who were mainly farmers and ranchers in the area.
The Fontana Fire Department continued to grow with the city, and in October 1953 a new recruit was hired by the name of R.J. Keen. Keen made Battalion Chief in 1958, Assistant Chief in 1968, and was named Acting Fire Chief in 1971, just 22 days prior to his 54th birthday. A year later, he was named Fire Chief of the Fontana Fire Department.

R.J. Keen approached the Muscoy Fire Protection District and the Bloomington Fire Protection District to discuss joining forces. The Fire Chief of Muscoy was Earl Mathiot and the Fire Chief of Bloomington was Nate Alvarez. An agreement was formed for a Joint Powers Authority (JPA) and this new department was called the Central Valley Fire Protection District. This occurred in 1973. Many more consolidations would soon come. Central Valley would eventually cover some 66 square miles.

With the birth of this new department, a centralized dispatch center was needed. The new location for this center would be in the front office of Fire Station 71 in Fontana. One of the key people in developing this new dispatch center was Emergency Communications Supervisor Dave Dowling. Like Keen, Dowling would be laying the groundwork for the future. Central Valley did very well, in terms of wages and reputation, and that carried them into the 1980s. In 1982, the Chino Fire Protection District joined Central Valley FPD. With the addition of the fourth agency, Central Valley FPD became the West San Bernardino Valley Fire Agency.

In 1985, Chino Fire decided to become an independent agency once again. As one department left eight others joined that year. 1985 was the year the San Bernardino County Fire Agency was formed. The San Bernardino County Fire Agency was designed to provide a management umbrella over the Districts, providing a single fire chief, administrative management, fire prevention and vehicle and training services. The joining Districts include Lake Arrowhead, Yucca Valley, Lucerne Valley, Wrightwood, Hinkley, Searles Valley, Green Valley Lake and Forest Falls.

In 1994 the County Consolidated Fire District (San Bernardino County Fire Department) was formed to manage all the fire protection districts, county service areas (CSA), and improvement zones, with the exception of CSA 38. The California Department of Forestry (CDF) continued to manage CSA 38 at that time. The District eliminated all district chief positions, encompassed all district employees, standardized pay scales and benefits and added hazardous materials, household hazardous waste code enforcement, and the Office of Emergency Services.

In 1997, in an effort to provide effective fire service and streamline cost, the County cancelled its contract with CDF and directed the unfunded areas and CSA 38 to be transferred to County Fire; bringing with it Devore, Grand Terrace, Needles, San Antonio Heights, Mentone, Phelan, Fawnskin, Baker, Harvard and the unfunded areas of the county.

In 1999 the City of Adelanto began contracting fire protection and emergency medical services with The San Bernardino County Fire Department. This contract paved the way for two other cities to contract as well; the City of Hesperia in 2004 and the City of Victorville in 2008.

The Fire Reorganization Plan was finalized and became effective July 1, 2008; dissolving 27 separate fire districts and merging them into a single fire protection district with four regional service zones. This reorganization created the San Bernardino County Fire Protection District, the parent organization that provides all administration, payroll, fiscal and support services, as County Fire’s administration had done in the past. Four regional service zones were created, leaving functions unchanged, but securing property taxes on a regional level that will provide continued fire services well into the future. In addition, within the new fire protection district, existing special taxes that were created by special elections remained in place. This reorganization has resulted in simplified budgeting and fiscal operations, greater flexibility in the use of department resources and assets and more effective use of executive management to oversee day-to-day operations.

On July 1, 2015 the Crest Forest Fire Protection District annexation into The San Bernardino County Fire Department was completed.

On July 1, 2016 the San Bernardino City Fire Department was annexed into The San Bernardino County Fire Department.

Also on July 1, 2016 the Twentynine Palms Fire Department was annexed into The San Bernardino County Fire Department.

In July 2017 the Upland Fire Department was annexed into The San Bernardino County Fire Department.

As of April 2019 the City of Victorville declined to renew their contract with The San Bernardino County Fire Department.

Divisions

Division 1 
West Valley Division – Bloomington, Fontana, Lytle Creek, Mount Baldy, San Antonio Heights, Upland and 3 other areas

Division 2 
East Valley Division – Devore, Grand Terrace, Mentone, Muscoy, San Bernardino

Division 3 
Mountain Division – Angelus Oaks, Crestline, Fawnskin, Forest Falls, Green Valley Lake, Lake Arrowhead, Rim Forest, Twin Peaks and 7 other areas

Division 4 
South Desert Division – 29 Palms, Big River, Earp, Havasu Landing, Joshua Tree, Landers, Needles, Parker, Park Moabi, Pioneer Town, Wonder Valley, Yucca Valley

Division 5 
Adelanto, Baker, Baldy Mesa, El Mirage, Harvard, Helendale, Hesperia, Hinkley, Lucerne Valley, Mountain View Acres, Oro Grande, Phelan, Pinion Hills, Spring Valley Lake, Trona, Wrightwood

Division 11 
Special Operations and Training Division – Aviation, EMS, Safety, Training, Wildland

Division 12 
Office of the Fire Marshal

Stations and equipment

Specialized Programs

Ambulance Operator Program
San Bernardino County Fire's single-function paramedics are classified under their Ambulance Operator (AO) Program. Initially created under a staffing shortage with the goal of increasing the number of cross-trained paramedics on their engine companies, the AO program now exists throughout the district with single-function medics staffing every ambulance in the fleet. The AO Program began in 2014 and has now become home to 96 single-function ambulance operators (half of which are paramedics), making SBCoFD the largest fire department provider of ambulance transport in the county. There are Paramedic (Advanced Life Support) Ambulance Operators (Paramedic) (ALS) (AOs) and Emergency Medical Technician (Basic Life Support) Ambulance Operators (EMT) (BLS) (AOs).

Paramedic (Advanced Life Support) Ambulance Operators (Paramedic) (ALS) (AOs) are licensed paramedics that render advance emergency medical care including airway management, initiating IVs, and administering advanced life support medications. They are also trained in utilizing cardiac monitoring and defibrillation to treat life-threatening heart conditions. Emergency Medical Technician (Basic Life Support) Ambulance Operators (EMT) (BLS) (AOs) maintain an EMT1 certification or greater and primarily serve as an ambulance operator while also providing basic medical care to patients including bandaging wounds, taking vital signs, splinting limbs, providing CPR, and moving patients.

References 

Fire departments in California